The Waikamaka River is a river of the Manawatū-Whanganui region of New Zealand's North Island. It is a tributary of the Whakaurekou River, part of the Rangitikei River system.

See also
List of rivers of New Zealand

References

Rivers of Manawatū-Whanganui
Rivers of New Zealand